Non Kho  is a tambon (subdistrict) located in the western region of Buntharik district, in Ubon Ratchathani Province, Thailand. In 2021, it had a population of 7,022 people. Neighbouring subdistricts are (clockwise from the south) Huai Kha, Sok Saeng, Nong Sano, and Bua Ngam.

History
The area was first colonized in the 1840s, with the first village, Ban Non Kho (บ้านโนนค้อ), created by a group of fifteen Laotian families led by Kundet Rittimat (ขุนเดช ฤทธิมาศ), who emigrated from present-day Laos to resettle in the area. They were followed by another group of immigrants from Ban Huai Lok (บ้านห้วยโลก) in Na Chaluai, led by Chai Damrong (ชัย ดำรงค์), and the final group, from Warin Chamrap, in 1957. The community area gradually expanded as the population grew; some areas later became independent villages, such as Ban Non Suan (บ้านโนนสวน), which was broken off from Ban Non Kho in 1991.

Non Kho became the new subdistrict's capital when a tambon (subdistrict) with the same name was created in 1979 by the separation of six villages in the northwest area of Huai Kha subdistrict. After its establishment, it was governed by its subdistrict council until the council was promoted to the Subdistrict Administrative Organization (SAO) in 1996.

Geography
The tambon covers 62 km2 and is located in the western region of the Buntharik district, on the Lam Dom Noi river basins.

Administration
The subdistrict of Non Kho is divided into eight villages (mubans; หมู่บ้าน), two of which, Non Kho and Non Sawang villages, was further divided into two and three community group (หมู่; Mu), respectively. As of the 2021 census, it had a population of 7,022 people with 2,333 households.

Since 1997, the Subdistrict Administrative Organization of Non Kho (องค์การบริหารส่วนตำบลโนนค้อ, Non Kho SAO) has been the local government responding to administer the area.

The following is a list of the subdistrict's mubans, which roughly correspond to the villages.

References

Tambon of Ubon Ratchathani Province